Peter Chandler Travis (born March 15, 1950) is an American musician, songwriter, producer and owner of Iddy Biddy record label. Travis plays many unique styles of music sometimes labeled as an "alternative Dixieland," though it is difficult to classify into genres. His career began with the comedic songwriting duo started with Steve Shook, Travis Shook and the Club Wow, which worked closely with top comedians of the time like George Carlin and Martin Mull.  Travis co-founded Sonic Trout Records with Chris Blood and later created his own record company, Iddy Biddy.  He has toured across America, Europe and Japan, and has developed a Japanese fan-base leading to several of Travis' albums being released on Japanese labels.

Travis created The Cape Cod Christmas Cavalcades for the Homeless and The Boston Christmas Cavalcades for the Homeless, annual fundraisers benefiting various organizations, and is the musical director for The Boston charity. Travis has written articles and reviews for New England publications as himself and under the byline Thurston Kelp.

Personal life 
Chandler Travis was born in New York City and his family moved to Connecticut when he was a child. His father worked as a textile salesman, his mother condensed books for Reader's Digest and his sister, Deborah Travis, is a nurse. Travis was influenced by jazz music from a young age; Duke Ellington, Ella Fitzgerald, Count Basie, and Ray Charles were among his favorite musicians, and he began playing guitar at the age of 13. In Connecticut, he attended prep schools (Taft, along with Steve Shook; and Forman School.) At Forman, Travis played guitar in a garage band that played from 1966-1968 called The Good Fairies, later renamed The St. James Infirmary. He played his first show at a coffee house at age 15, and had his first paying gig at age 16.

Travis has been a Cape Cod resident since the early 1970s. He continues performing, mostly in small New England venues, as a lead member of the Chandler Travis Philharmonic, the Chandler Travis Three-O, the Chandler Travis Philharmonette, and the Catbirds.

Travis Shook and the Club Wow 
Travis moved to Boston to attend Boston University. There he became friends with Steve Shook and the two formed the acoustic-comedy group, Travis Shook and the Club Show, in 1969. The group wrote folk-rock music with comedic, whimsical lyrics, and created several recurring characters.  They quickly gained popularity playing shows at campuses across the Northeast United States,  and were opened for by artists such as Bruce Springsteen, and E Street Band. They appeared on The Dick Cavett Show, The Tonight Show Starring Johnny Carson, and The Midnight Special. In 1972 the group released their only contemporaneous full-length album, The Essential Travis Shook and the Club Show, along with several other musicians including members of NRBQ. Tom Staley, the drummer from NRBQ, joined them on tour for a period of time, as did Rikki Bates (also performed as Vince Valium, formerly known as Rich Bates) who has been a frequent drummer in Travis' collaborations ever since.

Touring with George Carlin 
Starting July 29, 1971, they were booked as the opening act for Dave Van Ronk for a three-day set at a coffee house in Bryn Mawr, Pennsylvania, called The Main Point. Van Ronk had to cancel last minute and the club owner called in George Carlin, who had opened a series of shows at the same venue earlier that month, as an emergency replacement headliner. Travis and Shook nearly missed the set, being detained by police en route to the show for marijuana possession which the police confiscated; however, they did not find several tablets of MDA (a drug similar to MDMA) which the duo shared with Carlin who smoked marijuana with them in return. After the set Carlin was so impressed with the group that he signed them as his opening act, and they toured with him until 1981, including a performance at Carnegie Hall in 1974.

Carlin appeared on several tracks released by the Chandler Travis Philharmonic, such as "Tarnation", a track made from a blethering voicemail Carlin left Travis spoken in alien-mimicking phrases.  They continued working together until Carlin's death in 2008. Travis wrote and recorded the theme songs for The George Carlin Show, and Carlin's TV pilot, Apt. 2c, and wrote two additional songs for the show performed by Brian Doyle-Murray.

The Incredible Casuals
Travis and Shook met with drummer Rikki (Rich) Bates in 1978 and began working on a new, more serious band focused on pop-rock. Originally with Eric Rosenfeld on the guitar they went by the name The Susan Anton People; they were joined by Johnny Spampinato a couple of years later and became The Incredible Casuals. After a couple of singles, the "Let'S Go Summer Fun Maxi-EP" was released in 1982. Shook then left the group and was later replaced by Aaron Spade. In 1983 and '84, the group produced a monthly mail-order cassette subscription called the Inedible Casserole series in which they recorded and released a new album every other month. The Casuals played at a club called the Wellfleet Beachcomber in Wellfleet for 35 years every Sunday during summer months. Spampinato joined NRBQ in 1994; however, the Casuals continued to play part-time while their members focused on other projects for over 20 years until 2014.

Over the years, The Casuals were joined on stage by guest singers, including their soundman, Chris Blood, who had a recurring feature as "The White Prince," performing unusually inept covers of classic songs, with the Casuals credited as the Brain Bats of Venus, and they have released two albums on Sonic Trout Records: You've Got a Friend: The White Prince Story, and Resurrection!

Chandler Travis Philharmonic 
In 1996, the house band of the Lizard Lounge in Cambridge, Massachusetts, was a rhythm section led by Dinty Child. The club had a guest position that rotated weekly; Child was joined by Travis for one of these positions and by Travis' suggestion Child recruited a full brass section, leading to the formation of Chandler Travis Philharmonic. The Lizard Lounge resident band position was next filled by Session Americana.

Travis has created two smaller versions of the Philharmonic: the Chandler Travis Three-O, and the Chandler Travis Philharmonette; each group mostly plays different material with unique styles. The groups are known for regularly performing in brightly colored pajamas, smoking jackets, and hats. The Philharmonic in particular is a high-energy, theatrical group, often engaging with the audience in quirky ways during their performances like the way they present their tip jar; it is taped to a Roomba robot vacuum and roams the audience randomly and was dubbed the Honey Bunny 6000 by its inventor, trumpetist Kami Lyle.

The Philharmonic usually consists of nine members, currently, Chandler Travis (guitar/vocals), Alex Brander (drums), John Clark (upright bass), Fred Boak (vocals), Cliff Spencer (keyboards), Dinty Child (mandocello/mandolin/accordion/cello), and their three-piece horn section known as The June Trailer Dancers; Berke McKelvey (clarinets/saxophones/keys), Kami Lyle (trumpet), and Bob Pilkington (trombone).

Fred Boak (also known as "The Valet") was a longtime fan of the group before joining them. After befriending the group he began selling their merchandise at shows and managing Travis' website. Boak became a harmony singer with the Philharmonic's many versions around 2001 when he was called in as a last-minute substitute, and now performs regularly, although he describes his role as “being on stage, with a drink in my hand, looking good.” Boak replaced Travis as the musical director of  The Cape Cod Christmas Cavalcades for the Homeless in 2018.

Chandler Travis Three-O 
Chandler Travis Three-O is a quartet that was created to play smaller venues than Chandler Travis Philharmonic, it being difficult to find venues with the budget and stage-space to fulfill the Philharmonic's needs. Although they have rearranged songs from the Philharmonic to work with the quartet, there is enough material that the Three-O has quite a different repertoire from the Philharmonic, and they have released two albums. The scaled-down group is: Chandler Travis (guitar/vocals), Fred Boak (vocals), John Clark (upright bass), Berke McKelvey (saxes/clarinets/keyboards), and sometimes Kami Lyle (trumpet, vocals).

The Catbirds 
The Catbirds are a simple guitar/bass/drums quartet, play rootsier, louder rock, a bit closer to the Casuals in style than any of Travis's  other current groups. They've released a couple of EPs and 2012's full-length "Catbirds Say Yeah". The Catbirds' current lineup is: Travis (bass/vocals), Steve Wood (guitar/vocals), Mark Usher (guitarist) and Sam Wood (drums).

Discography

Travis Shook and the Club Wow

The Incredible Casuals
*Recorded, with Chris Blood on vocals, under the name of The White Prince with the Bat Brains From Venus.

Chandler Travis Philharmonic

Chandler Travis Three-O

The Catbirds

Independent 

*Lester was recorded by Lester, a group led by Steve Wood from 1992-1993 with members: Travis, Jay Cournoyer and Cliff Letsche.

**Bocce and Bourbon: The Comforting Songs of  ChandlerTravis and David Greenberger was co-written with David Greenberger.

Other works 
Travis played on Jonathan Edwards albums; maraca on Honky-Tonk Stardust Cowboy (1972), and marimba on Rhino Hi-five (2006).
Travis is credited on Martin Mull's albums; with backing vocals, harmonica, percussion and auxiliary in  Martin Mull (1972), and with vocals on Mulling it Over: A Musical Oeuvre View (1998).
Travis wrote and recorded the theme song for  The George Carlin Show, and Carlin's TV pilot, Apt. 2c.
Travis played bass guitar for the track "Antidisestablishmentarianism" from Go, Go, Gorilla's 1993 album It Was a Nightmare.
The Incredible Casuals song "Summertime" was used in the film Touching the Game: The Story of the Cape Cod Baseball League (2004).
Travis, Tom Ardolino, Johnny Spampinato, Aaron Spade & Rikki Bates are credited on P.J. O'Connell's album Careful (2007).
Five songs by The Incredible Casuals were used in the film Paper Man (2009): "This World", "Summer Nights" and "No Fun at Parties", "I Wanna Play Loud" and "Gotta Have You."
Travis wrote the score for the musical Boyce & Melinda Peterson’s Investment Strategies for the Post-Money World! (premiered 2009)
Travis is credited on P.J. O'Connell's albums Join the Crowd (2011), and Happy Go Lucky (.
Travis and Johnny Spampinato wrote original songs included on a soundtrack for The Simpsons.
Travis played bass in Zoë Lewis & the Souvenirs.

References

External links
 Chandler Travis' website 
 The Catbirds' website

1950 births
Living people
Record producers from New York (state)